Malta Enterprise is the Maltese government's exclusive agency focused on attracting inward investment and supporting enterprise in Malta.  Its role is to act as a single point of contact for all enterprise support in Malta and to provide cohesion to government policies and efforts relating to enterprise in the country.

The corporation came into being through the 2003 Malta Enterprise Act, and the agency, which became operational in January 2004. It combined the functions of three separate government offices – the Malta Development Corporation, (an investment promotion agency), Malta External Trade Corporation (an import-export promotion agency) and the Institute for the Promotion of Small Enterprise (a small business support service) – into a single entity that now serves as the national representative for Malta’s commercial and financial endeavors.

As the national economic development agency, Malta Enterprise develops support measures to create an environment conducive to the growth and development if enterprise in Malta, facilitates foreign investments, organises and hosts visiting business delegations and participates in global trade and business conferences.

In May 2012 Lawrence Zammit, former Chairman of Malta Development Corporation and Air Malta, was appointed Chairman, whereas Sue Vella, former Chief Executive Officer of the Employment and Training Corporation, was named Chief Executive Office of Malta Enterprise.

In May 2013 Mario Vella, former Chief Executive Officer of the Malta Development Corporation, was appointed Chairman, whilst William Wait was named the deputy chairman.

Once Mario Vella was appointed as Governor of the Central Bank of Malta in 2016, William Wait took over as chairman of Malta Enterprise.

References

External links
 Malta Enterprise web site
 Malta Enterprise portal for setting up business in Malta

Economy of Malta
Government agencies of Malta
Inward investment
Export promotion agencies